081 may refer to:

Telephony
 081, the telephone dialing code for the City of Naples and surroundings in Italy
 081, a former dialling code for London, UK (1990–1995)
 081, a telephone area code for mobile operators in Lebanon
 081, a mobile phone prefix code in Thailand

Other uses
 081, a character in Darling in the Franxx anime series
 Type 081 mine countermeasure vessel, a Chinese minesweeper/mine hunter
 Type 081 transport ship, a Chinese auxiliary ship
 Uncial 081, designation for Codex Tischendorfianus II, a 6th-century New Testament manuscript

See also